Rakt  is a village in the former municipality of Uden, North Brabant, the Netherlands. Since 2022 it has been part of the new municipality of Maashorst.

The site of a famous windmill, Molen van Jetten (built in 1811 and moved to its current location in 1900), Rakt is also home to FC de Rakt, an amateur football club founded in 1968 with its homeground at the Moleneind, below the mill. Each year the club organises a football tournament in the fields surrounding the mill.

FC de Rakt
In September 2008 the local women's soccer team FC de Rakt (FC de Rakt DA1) made international headlines by swapping its old kit for a new one featuring short skirts and tight-fitting shirts.

References

External links
FC de Rakt official website

Populated places in North Brabant
Geography of Maashorst